The Seventh Federal Electoral District of the Federal District (VII Distrito Electoral Federal del Distrito Federal) is one of the 300 Electoral Districts into which Mexico is divided for the purpose of elections to the federal Chamber of Deputies and one of 27 such districts in the Federal District ("DF" or Mexico City).

It elects one deputy to the lower house of Congress for each three-year legislative period, by means of the first past the post system.

District territory
Under the 2005 districting scheme, the DF's Seventh  District covers the south-east portion of the borough (delegación) of Gustavo A. Madero.

Previous districting schemes

1996–2005 district
Between 1996 and 2005, the Seventh District's territory  was identical to its present conformation.

Deputies returned to Congress from this district

XL Legislature
1946–1949: Juan Gutiérrez Lascurain (PAN)
L Legislature
1976–1979: María Elena Márquez de Torruco (PRI)
LI Legislature
1979–1982: David Reynoso (PRI)
LII Legislature
1982–1985: José de Jesús Fernández Alatorre (PRI)
LIII Legislature
1985–1988:
LIV Legislature
1988–1991: Jaime Fernández Sánchez (PAN)
LV Legislature
1991–1994:
LVI Legislature
1994–1997: Jorge Efraín Moreno Collado (PRI)
LVII Legislature
1997–2000:
LVIII Legislature
2000–2003: Mario Reyes Oviedo (PAN)
LIX Legislature
2003–2006: Iván García Solís (PRD)
LX Legislature
2006–2009: Juan Nicasio Guerra (PRD)

References and notes

Federal electoral districts of Mexico
Mexico City